Mangifera rufocostata (locally called asem kiat) is a species of plant in the family Anacardiaceae. It is a tree found in Sumatra, Peninsular Malaysia and Borneo.

References

rufocostata
Trees of Sumatra
Trees of Peninsular Malaysia
Trees of Borneo
Vulnerable plants
Taxonomy articles created by Polbot